The UCI Track Cycling World Championships – Men's tandem is the defunct world championship tandem event that was held annually at the UCI Track Cycling World Championships between 1966 and 1994. Czechoslovakia won with 9 titles the most times. 

At the 1900 championships a tandem event was organized. This race has never been officially recognized. The Dutch duo Harrie Meyers-Fernando Tomaselli won ahead of the French duo Edmond Jacquelin-Lucien Louvet and the French-American duo Charles Vanoni-Robert Protin. Because the race was not official the medalists are not listed here.

Medalists

References

External links
 List of winners at cyclingarchives.com
 List of Winnersen Tàndem at memoire-du-cyclisme.eu

tandem
Men's tandem
Lists of UCI Track Cycling World Championships medalists